Odontotermes ceylonicus, is a species of termite of the genus Odontotermes. It is native to India and Sri Lanka. Though nests in the ground, they never construct termitaria. It attacks many dead, diseased rotten plant roots and wooden buildings. It is a major pest of sugarcane and a secondary pest of tea.

References

External links
A Preliminary Inventory of Subterranean Termites in the Premises of Faculty of Science, University of Kelaniya and the Potential of a Ponerine Ant Species, Neemazal-F and Citronella Oil in the Control of Two Termite Species doi:10.4038/josuk.v7i0.6230
TERMITES ON CEYLON TEA ESTATES
 

Termites
Insects described in 1902
Arthropods of India